This is a list of songs inspired by insects.

Insects in music are known from everything from classical music and opera to ragtime and pop.

Rimsky-Korsakov imitates the quick buzzing vibrato of the bumblebee in his famous "The Flight of the Bumblebee". Popular songs with an insect theme include "glow-worm", "Poor Butterfly", "La Cucaracha", "The Boll Weevil", and "The Blue-Tailed Fly". Operas like Puccini's Madam Butterfly and Rousel's Le Festin de L’Araignée similarly reference arthropods.

Pop groups named after insects include Buddy Holly and the Crickets, The Beatles, Adam and the Ants and many others. Songs named after or inspired by the sounds of insects are listed below.

List

References

insect
Entomology
Insects in culture